Johann Friedrich Bause (3 January 1738 in Halle - 5 January 1814, Weimar) was a German copper engraver; primarily of portraits.

Life and work 
He was born to Christian Gottlieb Bause (b.1696), supervisor of the Halle saltworks, and his wife, Sophia Elisabeth née Dryander (1705-1761). He was initially self-taught. In 1759, he briefly worked in Augsburg, under the direction of Johann Jacob Haid. His inspiration came from the German expatriate engraver, Johann Georg Wille. While in Augsburg, he also made the acquaintance of portrait painter, Anton Graff.

In 1763, he married Henriette Charlotte Brünner, and they had two daughters. The eldest, had a talent for music, but died when she was only nineteen. The younger, Juliane Wilhelmine, married the banker, Karl Eberhard Löhr (1763–1813), son of the banker , in Leipzig. She also became an engraver and painter.

He moved from Halle to Leipzig in 1766, where he was named a Professor of copper engraving at the new Hochschule für Grafik und Buchkunst, and specialized in portraits. He also joined the famous Freemasons lodge, . In 1786, he was named an honorary member of the Prussian Academy of the Arts.

His final engraving was made in 1809, when his eyesight was beginning to wane. In 1813, he followed Juliane (who had recently been widowed) to Weimar, when she was expelled from her estate by General Jean Toussaint Arrighi de Casanova, the French Governor of Leipzig.

Works
His works, which are very numerous, are chiefly executed with the graver, which he handled with great purity and firmness. The following are his principal plates, except his portraits, which are chiefly of German characters of little celebrity:* 

Damon and Musidora, subject from Thomson; after Bach.
A Moonlight Scene; after the same.
The Magdalene; from a drawing by Bach, after Batoni.
Three Apostles; after Caravaggio; etching.
Venus and Cupid; after Carlo Cignani.
Michael Ehrlich; after B. Denner; a mezzotint.
The Repentance of St. Peter; after Dietrich.
The Good Housewife; after G. Dou.
Bust of a Girl; after Greuze.
Artemisia; after Guido.
The Head of Christ; after the same.
The Old Confidante; after Kupetsky.
Cupid feeling the Point of an Arrow  after Mengs.
Bust of a Girl, with a Basket of Boses; after Netscher.
The Sacrifice of Abraham; after Oeser.
La petite Rusée; after Reynolds.

A list of his works may be found in Nagler and Heineken. See also Dr. G. Keil's Katalog des Kupferstichwerkes von Johann Friedrich Bause, Leipzig, 1849. His daughter, Juliane, etched  a number of landscapes after Kobell, Both, and other artists.<ref name="Bryan">

References

Further reading 
 Georg Keil,Catalog des Kupferstichwerkes von Johann Friedrich Bause Verlag Weigel, 1849, 168 Seiten, Digitalisat
 
 
 Georg Keil: Catalog des Kupferstichwerkes von Johann Friedrich Bause: mit einigen biografischen Notizen; Leipzig, 1849 (Online)
 Nicole Linke: "Johann Friedrich Bause : ein heute kaum bekannter hallescher Kupferstecher des 18. Jahrhunderts".  In:  Von Nutzen und Vergnügen: Aus dem Kupferstichkabinett der Universität Halle, fliegenkopf-Verlag 1999, pp.142–161
 Stephan Brakensiek (Ed.): Leipziger Allerlei – Johann Friedrich Bause (1738–1814) und der Porträtstich im 18. Jahrhundert. Trierer Beiträge. Aus Forschung und Lehre an der Universität Trier; 30, Trier 2014

External links 

 Portrait engravings by Bause @ Tripota (Trier portrait databank)

German engravers
1738 births
1814 deaths
People from Halle (Saale)